This is a list of Members of the Legislative Council (excluding official members) in the colonial period from 12 October 1988 to 22 August 1991 after the 1988 Legislative Council Elections.

After the elections, there were 11 Official Members (including four ex officio), and 46 Unofficial Members, of whom 20 were appointed by the Governor, 14 elected from functional constituencies, one elected from among members of the Urban Council, one elected from among members of the Regional Council, and 10 elected by electoral college constituencies made up of members of all district boards.

List of Members of the Legislative Council 
Members who did not serve throughout the term are italicised.

Notes

References 
 Database on LegCo Members

See also 
 1988 Hong Kong legislative election

Legislative Council of Hong Kong